The 45th Saturn Awards, presented by the Academy of Science Fiction, Fantasy and Horror Films and honoring the best in science fiction, fantasy, horror, and other genres belonging to genre fiction in film, television, home entertainment, and local stage production from March 1, 2018 to July 7, 2019, were held on September 13, 2019 in Avalon Hollywood, and hosted by actress and comedian Aisha Tyler. Nominations were announced on July 15, 2019.

This ceremony notably marked considerable changes for the Saturn Awards; although the awards had rewarded solely works from the previous year until 2016, when the eligibility was changed to works released from March of the previous year to February of the current year, the eligibility was, for this ceremony, extended to March of the previous year to early July of the current one. It is also the first Saturn Awards ceremony not to be held in Burbank, California since 2008, and the second one to air live after the 1978 ceremony (as the show was made available for livestream on different platforms). It also marked major changes for the categories; most notably, series were split into two different sets of categories ("Television" / "Streaming") for streaming television series released on streaming media/video on demand services such as Netflix or Hulu (films released on those platforms are also eligible for the acting categories). The number of "Best Series" awards for streaming (previously limited to Best New Media Television Series and Best New Media Superhero Series) extended; although they had previously shared acting categories with traditional television, streaming series also now get their own. However, certain categories for television are not present for streaming, or have been fused into one, resulting in seven categories compared to twelve for traditional television. Additionally, the Legion M Breakout Director Award, rewarding first-time film directors, was introduced and handed out this year; Emma Tammi won for the supernatural Western horror film The Wind (2018). Conversely, Best Television Presentation, given out since 1995, was discontinued; however, the award was revived the following ceremony under a new title—Best Television Presentation (under 10 Episodes)—and renamed once again as Best Limited Event Series in 2022.

Avengers: Endgame led the nominations for film with fourteen (sharing Black Panthers nomination record as the second/third most nominated film in the Saturn Awards' history from the previous ceremony), followed by Aladdin with nine and Us with eight. Game of Thrones led the nominations for television with nine, followed by The Walking Dead with six and Outlander with five; The Haunting of Hill House led the nominations for streaming with six, followed by Lost in Space and Star Trek: Discovery with five each.

For film, Avengers: Endgame won the most awards with six, including Best Comic-to-Motion Picture Release and Best Actor in a Film (Robert Downey Jr.), followed by A Quiet Place and Spider-Man: Far From Home with two each. For television, Game of Thrones eighth and final season won the most awards with four, followed by The Walking Dead with three; Star Trek: Discovery became the streaming series with the most wins with three, followed by Stranger Things with two.

Winners and nominees

Film

Television

Programs

Acting

Home Entertainment

Local Stage Production

Special Achievement Awards
 Visionary Award – Jon Favreau
 Dan Curtis Legacy Award – Jeph Loeb
 Stan Lee World Builder Award – Kevin Feige

Multiple wins and nominations

Wins

Nominations

References

Saturn Awards ceremonies
2018 film awards
2019 film awards
2019 in California
2018 television awards
2019 television awards
2018 in American cinema
2019 in American cinema
2018 awards in the United States
2019 awards in the United States